Dermot Lawlor (born 21 August 1972) is an Irish former hurler who played as a left corner-forward for the Kilkenny senior team.

Lawlor joined the team during the 1992 championship and was a regular member of the team for just two seasons. His inter county career was cut short due to a number of serious knee injuries. An All-Ireland medalist in the minor grade, he won two All-Ireland winners' medals as a non-playing substitute.

At club level Lawlor played with St Martin's.

Kilkenny Hurler of the Year in 1990.

References

1972 births
Living people
St Martin's (Kilkenny) hurlers
Kilkenny inter-county hurlers